Daniel Morris (January 4, 1812 – April 22, 1889) was a U.S. Representative from New York during the American Civil War.

Biography
Morris was born in Fayette, New York on January 4, 1812.  He attended the public schools and the Canandaigua Academy in Ontario County, New York.  Morris farmed and taught school before deciding on a legal career.  He studied law, was admitted to the bar in 1845 and commenced practice in Penn Yan, New York.

Morris was active in politics as a Free Soil (anti-slavery) Democrat, and served as District Attorney of Yates County from 1847 to 1850. He was a member of the New York State Assembly (Yates Co.) in 1859.

Morris became a Republican when the party was founded in the 1850s, and served as chairman of the party in Yates County.  At the start of the American Civil War he joined with pro-Union Democrats to organize unity rallies and recruiting drives.

He was elected as a to the Thirty-eighth and Thirty-ninth Congresses (March 4, 1863 – March 3, 1867). He was not a candidate for reelection in 1866, and resumed the practice of law.

He died in Penn Yan, New York on April 22, 1889, and was interred in Lake View Cemetery.

References
 Retrieved on 2009-04-07

1812 births
1889 deaths
People from Fayette, New York
New York (state) lawyers
People of New York (state) in the American Civil War
People from Penn Yan, New York
Republican Party members of the United States House of Representatives from New York (state)
Burials at Lake View Cemetery (Penn Yan, New York)
19th-century American politicians
19th-century American lawyers